Kelly Jones and Robert Van't Hof were the defending champions, but Jones did not compete this year. Van't Hof teamed up with Laurie Warder and lost in the quarterfinals to Gary Muller and Danie Visser.

Wally Masur and Jason Stoltenberg won the title by defeating Ronnie Båthman and Rikard Bergh 4–6, 7–6, 6–4 in the final.

Seeds

Draw

Draw

References

External links
 Official results archive (ATP)
 Official results archive (ITF)

Doubles